Pavlovo is a rural locality (a village) in Orlovskoye Rural Settlement, Velikoustyugsky District, Vologda Oblast, Russia. The population was 3 as of 2002.

Geography 
Pavlovo is located 61 km southeast of Veliky Ustyug (the district's administrative centre) by road. Navolok is the nearest rural locality.

References 

Rural localities in Velikoustyugsky District